The Galleria Nazionale d'Arte Antica or National Gallery of Ancient Art is an art museum in Rome, Italy. It is the principal national collection of older paintings in Rome – mostly from before 1800; it does not hold any antiquities. It has two sites: the Palazzo Barberini and the Palazzo Corsini.

Design
The Palazzo Barberini was designed for Pope Urban VIII, a member of the Barberini family, by the sixteenth-century architect Carlo Maderno on the old location of Villa Sforza. Its central salon ceiling was decorated by Pietro da Cortona with the visual panegyric of the Allegory of Divine Providence and Barberini Power.

Paletti Corsini

The Palazzo Corsini, formerly known as Palazzo Riario, is a fifteenth-century palace, rebuilt in the eighteenth century by the architect Ferdinando Fuga for Cardinal Neri Maria Corsini.

See also

Paintings in the Galleria Nazionale d'Arte Antica
 List of national galleries

References

External links
 
 

 
Arte Antica
National museums of Italy
Ancient Art
Museums established in 1893